Los Palacios y Villafranca is a city located in the province of Seville, Spain. According to the 2006 census (INE), the city has a population of 35,225 inhabitants.

Twin towns - sister cities
 Los Palacios, Cuba
 Saint-Colomban, Loire-Atlantique, France
 Rivanazzano Terme, Italy

Notable people
Jesús Navas (born 1985), football player
Fabián Ruiz (born 1996), football player
Gavi (born 2004), football player

References

External links

 
 Los Palacios Cofrade - Holy Week - Los Palacios y Villafranca
 The official Website of the "Brotherhood of the Triumphal Entry of Jesus into Jerusalem, San Juan de la Palma and Our Lady of the Angels". (In ):
  Hermandad de la Borriquita de Los Palacios y Villafranca — Los Palacios y Villafranca Brothers of the little Palm Sunday donkey

Municipalities of the Province of Seville